Tarpela is a genus of darkling beetles in the family Tenebrionidae. There are about five described species in Tarpela.

Species
These five species belong to the genus Tarpela:
 Tarpela formosana Masumoto, 1981 g
 Tarpela micans (Fabricius, 1798) g b
 Tarpela undulata (LeConte, 1866) b
 Tarpela venusta (Say, 124) b
 Tarpela zoltani Masumoto, 1981 g
Data sources: i = ITIS, c = Catalogue of Life, g = GBIF, b = Bugguide.net

References

Further reading

External links

 

Tenebrioninae